David Paynter may refer to:

David Paynter (cricketer) (born 1981), English cricketer
David Paynter (artist) (1900–1975), Sri Lankan artist
David Paynter, High Sheriff of Pembrokeshire
David William Paynter (1791–1823), English author
David William Paynter (born 1968), Australian, General Manager / Specialist in Supply Chain Operations

See also
David Painter (disambiguation)
David Panter (died 1558), Scottish diplomat, clerk and bishop of Ross